The 2015–16 Houston Baptist Huskies men's basketball team represented Houston Baptist University in the 2015–16 NCAA Division I men's basketball season. This season was head coach Ron Cottrell's twenty-fifth season at HBU. The Huskies played their home games at the Sharp Gymnasium. They were members of the Southland Conference. They finished the season 17–17, 10–8 in Southland play to finish in fifth place. They defeated Southeastern Louisiana to advance to the semifinals of the Southland tournament where they lost to Stephen F. Austin. They were invited to the College Basketball Invitational where they lost in the first round to UNC Greensboro.

Media
All Houston Baptist games will be broadcast online live by the Legacy Sports Network (LSN). LSN will also provide online video for every non-televised Huskies home game. However HBU games can air on ESPN3 as part of the Southland Conference TV packages.

Preseason
The Huskies finished ninth in both the Southland Conference Coaches' Poll and the Sports Information Director's Poll.

Roster

Schedule and results
Source:

|-
!colspan=12 style="background:#002366; color:#FF7F00;"|Regular season

|-
!colspan=12 style="background:#002366; color:#FF7F00;"| Southland tournament

|-
!colspan=12 style="background:#002366; color:#FF7F00;"| CBI

See also
2015–16 Houston Baptist Huskies women's basketball team

References

Houston Christian Huskies men's basketball seasons
Houston Baptist
Houston Baptist Huskies basketball
Houston Baptist Huskies basketball
Houston Baptist